Alex Harris Short Jr. was a politician who served in the Texas House from 1983 to 1987.

Life
Short Jr. was born on January 5, 1947, to Alex Short Sr. and Bernice Marie Tucker in Bell County, Texas, US. He has 1 sister, named Jan Short. He died on March 10, 1996, at the age of 49.

Politics
Alex ran for the Texas House in the 1982 and 1984 election and won. He served from January 11, 1983, to January 13, 1987. He retired and served no more terms.

References

1947 births
1996 deaths
Democratic Party members of the Texas House of Representatives
20th-century American politicians